There are two rivers named Pilões River.

Brazil
 Pilões River (Santa Catarina)
 Pilões River (São Paulo)